Heat death may refer to:

Heat death of the universe, a proposed cosmological event
 Heat death paradox, a philosophical examination of the cosmological event
The Heat Death of the Universe, 2003 album by punk band Off Minor
"The Heat Death of the Universe", a short story by Pamela Zoline
Hyperthermia, injury up to and including death, from excessive heat
Thermal shock, the destruction of equipment by overheating

See also 

 Dead Heat (disambiguation)
 Heat Death of the Universe (disambiguation)